List of rulers of Paphlagonia, an ancient region and Hellenistic kingdom in northwestern Asia Minor.

Legendary kings of Paphlagonia 

(according to Flavius Josephus)
 Riphat, son of Gomer, grandson of Japheth (legendary ancestor of «Riphatheans, now called Paphlagonians»).

(according to classic Greek mythology)
 Tantalus the Elder, son of Zeus.
 Pelops, son of Tantalus.
 Broteas, son of Tantalus.
 Tantalus the Younger, son of Broteas.

(according to Homer's Iliad)
 Pylaemenes, son of Bilsates or Melius (king of the Eneti tribe of Paphlagonia).

Satraps of Paphlagonia under the Achaemenid Empire and the Macedonian Empire 

(native Paphlagonian dynasty)
 ca. 425–400 BCE: Corylas I.
 ca. 400–380 BCE: Cotys I, son or brother of Corylas I.
 ca. 380–364 BCE: Thuys I, son of Corylas I or Cotys I.

(Cappadocian dynasty)
 364–362 BCE: Datames I of Cappadocia, son of Camissares of Cilicia.

(Achaemenid non-dynastic satraps)
 362–353 BCE: Sysinas I.
 353–334 BCE: Arsites I.

(Macedonian satraps)
 334–325 BCE: Calas I, son of Harpalus of Elimiotis.
 325–323 BCE: Demarchus I.
 323–316 BCE: Eumenes I of Cardia.
 316–306 BCE: Antigonus I Monophthalmus (king of Asia from 306 BCE).

To the kingdom of Antigonus I Monophthalmus in 306–302 BCE…

To the kingdom of Pontus in 302–276 BCE…

To Galatia from 276 BCE…

Kings of Paphlagonia 

(Galatian dynasty)
 ca. 200–170 BCE: Morzios I (in 182–179 BCE ruled only in South-Eastern part of country).
 182–179 BCE: Gaizatorix I (an ally of Pharnaces I of Pontus; ruled in North-Western part of country).
 ca. 170–150 BCE: Morzios II, son of Morzios I.
 ca. 150–140 BCE: Pylaemenes I, son or brother of Morzios II.
 ca. 140–130 BCE: Pylaemenes II, son of Pylaemenes I (bequeathed his kingdom to Pontus after death).

(Pontian dynasty)
 130–121 BCE: Mithridates I (V) Euergetes, son of Pharnaces I of Pontus.
 121–119 BCE: Mithridates II (VI) Eupator Dionysus, son of Mithridates I (V) [1st time].
 121–119 BCE: Mithridates III (VII) Chrestus, son of Mithridates I (V) [co-ruler with brother].
 121–119 BCE: Laodice (VI), daughter of Antiochus IV of Syria, widow of Mithridates I (V), mother of Mithridates II (VI) and Mithridates III (VII) [regentess].

(Galatian dynasty)
 119–108 BCE: Astreodon I, relative (probably brother) of Pylaemenes II.

(Bithynian dynasty)
 108– 89 BCE: Pylaemenes III Euergetes, son of Nicomedes III of Bithynia.

(Pontian dynasty)
 89 – 84 BCE: Mithridates II (VI) Eupator Dionysus, son of Mithridates I (V) [2nd time].

(Bithynian dynasty)
 84 – 74 BCE: Nicomedes I (IV) Philopator, son of Nicomedes III of Bithynia.

To Roman Republic in 74–73 BCE…

(Pontian dynasty)
 73 – 70 BCE: Mithridates II (VI) Eupator Dionysus, son of Mithridates I (V) [3rd time].

To Roman Republic in 70–68 BCE…

(Pontian dynasty)
 68 – 66 BCE: Mithridates II (VI) Eupator Dionysus, son of Mithridates I (V) [4th time].

To Roman Republic in 66–65 BCE…

Client kings under Roman authority 

(Bithynian dynasty)
 65 – 51 BCE: Pylaemenes IV, son of Pylaemenes III (co-ruler with brother).
 65 – 48 BCE: Attalus I, son of Pylaemenes III (co-ruler with brother to 51 BCE) [1st time].

(Pontian dynasty)
 48 – 47 BCE: Pharnaces I (II) of Bosporus, son of Mithridates II (VI).

(Bithynian dynasty)
 47 – 40 BCE: Attalus I, son of Pylaemenes III [2nd time].

(Tectosagian dynasty)
 40 – 36 BCE: Castor I (II) of Galatia, son of Castor (I) (tetrarch of the Tectosagi tribe in Galatia) and daughter of  Deiotarus I of Galatia (tetrarch of the Tolistobogii tribe in Galatia, then king of Galatia).

To Roman Republic (under authority of Marcus Antonius) in 36–31 BCE…

(Tectosagian dynasty)
 31 –  6 BCE: Deiotarus I (III) Philadelphus, son of Castor I (II).
 31 – 27 BCE: Deiotarus II (IV) Philopator, son of Deiotarus I (III) [co-ruler with father].

To Roman Empire (under authority of Augustus) in 6 BCE (merged with Galatia).

See also 

 Paphlagonia
 Paphlagonia (theme)

Sources 

 Broughton, T. Robert S., The Magistrates of the Roman Republic, Vol. I (1951)
 Smith, William, Dictionary of Greek and Roman Biography and Mythology, Vol III (1867)
 Truhart P., Regents of Nations. Systematic Chronology of States and Their Political Representatives in Past and Present. A Biographical Reference Book, Part 1: Antiquity Worldwide (2000).

Paphlagonia
Paphlagonia